The Arizona Theatre Company is a nonprofit, professional regional theater company operating in both Tucson and Phoenix, Arizona. It performs a season of six productions at two theatres—the only League of Resident Theatres member to do so—at the Temple of Music and Art in Tucson and the Herberger Theater Center in Phoenix.

History
The Arizona Theatre Company (ATC) was founded by Sandy Rosenthal in 1967 as the Arizona Civic Theatre. It originally performed in the basement of the old Santa Rita Hotel in Tucson. In 1972, the company achieved full professional status and became a member of the League of Resident Theatres (LORT).

The company began presenting a portion of its season in Phoenix in 1978, and a year later, its name was changed to Arizona Theatre Company.

In May 2019, Sean Daniels became the company's artistic director.

ATC has been performing full seasons in both Tucson and Phoenix since 1983. It has produced more than 280 plays in its decades-long history, with an emphasis on European and American classics, musicals, and world- and Arizona-premiere productions.

Learning & community engagement
ATC offers both adult and student learning opportunities statewide. Through school and summer programs, ATC focuses on teaching youth about literacy, cultural development, performing arts, specialty techniques used on stage, and dramatic literature.

References

External links
 

Theatre companies in Arizona
Theatres in Arizona
League of Resident Theatres
Tourist attractions in Tucson, Arizona